The St. Louis Cardinals 1984 season was the team's 103rd season in St. Louis, Missouri and the 93rd season in the National League. The Cardinals went 84-78 during the season and finished 3rd in the National League East, 12½ games behind their arch-rivals, the Chicago Cubs.  It was also the final season of the Columbia blue road uniforms for the Cardinals.

Offseason 
 January 17, 1984: Rafael Santana was released by the Cardinals.
 March 26, 1984: Jamie Quirk was released by the Cardinals.

Regular season 
Pitcher Joaquín Andújar and shortstop Ozzie Smith won Gold Gloves this year.  Bruce Sutter had a then-NL record of 45 saves.

 June 23, 1984: What turned out to be a key game for the Cubs occurred at Wrigley, with the Cubs facing the rival Cardinals on the nationally televised "Game of the Week". The Cardinals led throughout the game, and led 9-8 going into the bottom of the ninth with closer Bruce Sutter on the mound. Second baseman Ryne Sandberg led off the ninth with a solo home run into the left-field bleachers, tying the game at nine. The following inning, St. Louis regained the lead, and Sutter stayed in the game attempting to close out the win. After the first two batters were retired, Bob Dernier walked, bringing up Sandberg again. He promptly hit another game-tying home run into the left-field bleachers, sending the Wrigley fans into a frenzy. The Cardinals did not score in the top of the 11th, but the Cubs loaded the bases on three walks, then rookie Dave Owen singled in the winning run. Willie McGee hit for the cycle and had 6 RBI but Ryne Sandberg had 7 RBI in the game. Henceforth, this game has become known as "The Sandberg Game".

Season standings

Record vs. opponents

Notable transactions 
 April 5, 1984: Gary Rajsich was purchased by the Cardinals from the New York Mets.
 May 10, 1984: Dane Iorg was purchased from the Cardinals by the Kansas City Royals.
 June 15, 1984: Ken Oberkfell was traded by the Cardinals to the Atlanta Braves for Ken Dayley and Mike Jorgensen.

Draft picks 
 June 4, 1984: 1984 Major League Baseball Draft
Lance Johnson was drafted by the Cardinals in the 6th round. Player signed June 13, 1984.
Craig Wilson was drafted by the Cardinals in the 20th round.

Roster

Player stats

Batting

Starters by position 
Note: Pos = Position; G = Games played; AB = At bats; H = Hits; Avg. = Batting average; HR = Home runs; RBI = Runs batted in

Other batters 
Note: G = Games played; AB = At bats; H = Hits; Avg. = Batting average; HR = Home runs; RBI = Runs batted in

Pitching

Starting pitchers 
Note: G = Games pitched; IP = Innings pitched; W = Wins; L = Losses; ERA = Earned run average; SO = Strikeouts

Other pitchers 
Note: G = Games pitched; IP = Innings pitched; W = Wins; L = Losses; ERA = Earned run average; SO = Strikeouts

Relief pitchers 
Note: G = Games pitched; W = Wins; L = Losses; SV = Saves; ERA = Earned run average; SO = Strikeouts

Awards and honors

League top ten finishers 
Joaquín Andújar, National League Leader, Wins (20)
Joaquín Andújar, National League Leader, Innings Pitched (261.1)
Joaquín Andújar, National League Leader, Shutouts (4)

Farm system 

LEAGUE CHAMPIONS: Louisville

References

External links
1984 St. Louis Cardinals at Baseball Reference
1984 St. Louis Cardinals team page at www.baseball-almanac.com

St. Louis Cardinals seasons
Saint Louis Cardinals season
St Louis